The Progressive Democratic Patriots (PDP) is a political party in Trinidad and Tobago. Founded in 2016, it is currently the second-largest party in Tobagonian politics following the decline of the Tobago Organisation of the People. The party plans to contest the upcoming Trinidadian local election and every seat in the next general election, officially launching as a national party on 1 May 2022. It later provided a plan for Tobagonian independence.

In the January 2021 Tobago House of Assembly election, the party won the same number of seats (6) as the Tobago Council of the People's National Movement, breaking their streak of winning every Tobago House of Assembly election since 2001. It later led to a snap election being called in December 2021 Tobago House of Assembly election December to break the tie, as well as an increase in the number of legislative seats from 12 to 15 (an odd number) to avoid future ties.

In the December 2021 Tobago House of Assembly snap election, the PDP won an unprecedented 14 out of the 15 seats available, ending 21 consecutive years of PNM control over the Assembly. PDP member Farley Chavez Augustine was sworn in as the 5th Chief Secretary of the Tobago House of Assembly on 9 December 2021.

In 2022, 13 PDP members of the Tobago House of Assembly left the party, leaving the leader, Watson Duke, as the sole PDP Assembly member.

References

Political parties established in 2016
Regionalist parties
Subnational political parties
Political parties in Trinidad and Tobago
Tobago
Tobago portal
2016 establishments in Trinidad and Tobago
2016 in Trinidad and Tobago